Hannah James is a British–American actress. James grew up on a rural farm in Madison County, Virginia, which the Culpeper Star Exponent called an "1830 homestead".

Early life
James was home-schooled, until the age of ten. She started taking dance lessons when she was just two years old. As a youth she studied ballet, but describes deciding she would seek out a career as a regular actor, like her heroines Maggie Smith and Judi Dench, because the intense physical requirements dancers put on their bodies meant they had short careers. James attended the Guildford School of Acting in Surrey, England.

Career
Her first major role was a Civil War belle who becomes a volunteer nurse, in the mini-series Mercy Street—set in Virginia. The character James plays, Emma Green, was based on a historical figure. As in the miniseries, she was a daughter of the owners of the hotel that the Union seizes to use as a hospital, the Mansion House Hospital. Many Virginian newspapers celebrated that the role of Virginian belle was played by a Virginian. Women's Wear Daily, noting that the series would be broadcast in the same time slot as the very popular costume drama Downton Abbey, suggested James was poised to be the next "Lady Mary," the beautiful and glamorous character central to much of the drama of the earlier series. James's costumes required her to wear a corset, and she described how she almost fainted on one particularly long day on set.

On November 12, 2016, producers announced that she had been cast in a single episode role (3.4) for the third season of Outlander.

Filmography

References

American television actresses
British television actresses
1994 births
Living people
People from Madison County, Virginia
Actresses from Virginia
21st-century American actresses
21st-century British actresses
Alumni of the Guildford School of Acting